Sungwadia, also known as Marino and North Maewo, is an Oceanic language spoken on Maewo, Vanuatu.

Phonology

Consonants 

 /k/ can also have prenasal allophones [ᵑɡ] or [ᵑk].
 /ŋʷ/ can also have an allophone of a labial [mʷ] in word-initial position.

Vowels 

 /e, o/ can also have allophones of more open sounds [ɛ, ɔ].
 /i/ can also be heard as a semivowel [j] in word-final position.

Notes

References
 

Penama languages